Sujina is a village and jamoat in western Tajikistan. It is part of the city of Panjakent in Sughd Region. The jamoat has a total population of 16,543 (2017). Predominantly Uzbeks (Barlas)

References

Populated places in Sughd Region
Jamoats of Tajikistan